Divorce is a 1933 Chinese novel by Lao She, written in Chongqing, the temporary Chinese capital during the Second Sino-Japanese War.

It was translated by Helena Kuo as The Quest for Love of Lao Lee.

English translations
It was translated to English 2 times in 1948:

King's translation, no longer widely accessible, was unauthorized and heavily altered and abridged. Lao She who was in the United States from 1946 to 1949 had wanted the publication blocked, but his efforts were circumvented when King (pen name of Robert Spencer Ward) established his own publisher "King Publications" for the book. Lao She eventually took the matter to court and won the case. Meanwhile, he worked with Helena Kuo for an "authorized" translation, which also differed from the original but presumably with his approval. Kuo's translation was named The Quest for Love of Lao Lee to distinguish it from King's version.

Adaptations
Divorce, a 1992 Chinese film starring Zhao Youliang
Divorce, a 1999 Chinese TV drama starring Ge You

References

Novels by Lao She
20th-century Chinese novels
1933 novels
Chinese novels adapted into films
Chinese novels adapted into television series
Chinese Republican era novels
Chinese novels adapted into plays